The 1910 United States elections elected the members of the 62nd United States Congress, occurring during the Fourth Party System. The election was held in the middle of Republican President William Howard Taft's term. The Socialist Party won election to Congress for the first time. Arizona and New Mexico were admitted as states during the 62nd Congress.

Democrats won massive gains in the House, taking control of a chamber of Congress for the first time since the 1894 elections.

In the Senate, Democrats won major gains, but Republicans continued to control the chamber.

The election was a major victory for progressives in both parties. Taft had alienated many progressives in his own party, and allies of Taft lost several nomination battles. The strengthening of progressive Republicans helped lead to Theodore Roosevelt's third party run in 1912. Meanwhile, Woodrow Wilson's landslide gubernatorial election victory in New Jersey helped position him as a major candidate for the 1912 Democratic nomination. The progressive victory led to the passage of the 17th Amendment and the establishment of the Department of Labor during the 62nd Congress.

See also
1910 United States House of Representatives elections
1910–11 United States Senate elections
1910 United States gubernatorial elections

References

 
1910
1910